The enzyme trans-L-3-hydroxyproline dehydratase catalyzes the chemical reaction

trans-L-3-hydroxyproline  Δ1-pyrroline 2-carboxylate + H2O

This enzyme belongs to the family of lyases, specifically the hydro-lyases, which cleave carbon-oxygen bonds.  The systematic name of this enzyme class is ''trans-L-3-hydroxyproline hydro-lyase (Δ1-pyrroline-2-carboxylate-forming). This enzyme is also called trans''-L-3-hydroxyproline hydro-lyase.

References 

 
 

EC 4.2.1
Enzymes of unknown structure